The Dutch Eredivisie in the 1959–60 season was contested by 18 teams. AFC Ajax won the championship, after a decision match against Feijenoord which was won by 5–1.

League standings

Championship play-off

AFC Ajax qualified for the 1960–61 European Cup.

Relegation play-off

Blauw-Wit Amsterdam are relegated to Eerste Divisie.

Note: No edition of the KNVB Cup was held this year.

Results

See also
 1959–60 Eerste Divisie
 1959–60 Tweede Divisie

References

 Eredivisie official website - info on all seasons 
 RSSSF

Eredivisie seasons
Netherlands
1959–60 in Dutch football